Churchill Kohlman (January 28, 1906 – May 25, 1983) was an American songwriter who wrote Johnnie Ray's 1951 hit, "Cry" while working in a Pittsburgh dry cleaning factory as the night watchman.

Royalties from "Cry" were the subject of a bitter legal dispute between Kohlman and Perry Alexander, owner of music publisher Mellow Music. Alexander was ordered by arbitrators to pay Kohlman $15,331.24 to settle the dispute in 1953.

Kohlman wrote hundreds of other songs, but none achieved the success of "Cry".

Churchill had the following siblings: Homer Kohlman (1907–1985); and Alyse Kohlman Klaytor. After his success with "Cry", he was a correspondent for Prevue, a Chicago-based show-business magazine. He married Viola (1915–1995) and had the following children: Phyllis Kohlman O'Leary and Eleanor Kohlman Smith; and Carl Kohlman. He died under the name Charles Kohlman of a heart attack in 1983, at 77 years old, in the Point Breeze neighborhood of Pittsburgh. His grave is at Homewood Cemetery in Point Breeze.

Popular culture
The Johnnie Ray version of "Cry" was used in the 1987 Ridley Scott film, Someone to Watch Over Me.

Other versions
Ronnie Dove recorded the song in 1966, and his version was a Top 20 hit on the Hot 100 and Easy Listening charts. He performed the song on The Ed Sullivan Show the following year. 
Kevin Coyne recorded a version of the song for his 1978 album Dynamite Daze.

References

External links
New York Times obit

Songwriters from Pennsylvania
African-American songwriters
Musicians from Pittsburgh
1906 births
1983 deaths
Burials at Homewood Cemetery
20th-century American composers
20th-century African-American musicians